Sam Kennedy (1896 – 9 December 1963) was an English professional footballer who was on the books of five different Football League clubs. He started his career as a right-half, but later played in the centre forward position.

Biography
Samuel Kennedy was born in the small village of Platts Common near Hoyland, West Riding of Yorkshire, in 1896. Away from football, he was also a keen sprinter. After retiring from football, he lived in Scunthorpe, where he worked in a hotel. After the Second World War, Kennedy became a director of Scunthorpe United. He remained in the town for the rest of his life and died there on 9 December 1963.

Career
Kennedy started his footballing career in local-league football with Wombwell. In August 1920, he was signed by Football League First Division side Huddersfield Town, but he failed to make a first-team appearance for the club. The following summer, Kennedy joined Football League champions Burnley. However, he was again unable to break into the senior team, and was only used in the reserve side. He subsequently returned to non-League football with Denaby United in December 1921 before re-joining Wombwell for the start of the 1922–23 season.

In February 1924, Kennedy moved to Football League Second Division club Nelson for a transfer fee of £200. He made his Nelson debut in the 0–2 defeat to South Shields on 2 February, and was also selected for the next two matches as the team lost to South Shields and Bury. After more than a month out of the side, Kennedy was reinstated for the trip to Bradford City on 29 March. He made his sixth and final league appearance for Nelson in the 1–3 home defeat to Port Vale on 12 April 1924. The team was relegated to the Third Division North at the end of the season, but Kennedy remained at Nelson despite the departures of several other players.

Kennedy returned to the Second Division in October 1924, when he was signed by London-based team Fulham. During a two-year association with Fulham he played six league matches for the Cottagers, scoring one goal. In October 1926, Kennedy transferred to Barnsley, thus returning to Yorkshire. He scored five goals in nine league appearances for the club in the most prolific period of his professional career. Upon his departure from Barnsley in March 1927, he joined Mexborough Town and went on to play non-League football for several seasons, representing such clubs as Shirebrook, Scunthorpe & Lindsey United, Brigg Town and Broughton Rangers.

References

1896 births
1963 deaths
People from Hoyland
English footballers
Association football defenders
Association football forwards
Wombwell F.C. players
Huddersfield Town A.F.C. players
Burnley F.C. players
Denaby United F.C. players
Nelson F.C. players
Fulham F.C. players
Barnsley F.C. players
Mexborough Athletic F.C. players
Shirebrook Miners Welfare F.C. players
Scunthorpe United F.C. players
Brigg Town F.C. players
Broughton Rangers F.C. players
English Football League players